Fiona Shaw  (born Fiona Mary Wilson; 10 July 1958) is an Irish film and theatre actress. Known for extensive work with the Royal Shakespeare Company and the National Theatre she has received numerous accolades including two Laurence Olivier Awards and BAFTA Award as well as nominations for three Primetime Emmy Awards and a Tony Award. In 2020, she was listed at No. 29 on The Irish Times list of Ireland's greatest film actors. She was made an Honorary Commander of the Order of the British Empire (CBE) by Queen Elizabeth II in 2001.

She won two Laurence Olivier Award for Best Actress for roles in the plays Electra, As You Like It, and The Good Person of Szechwan (1990) and Machinal (1994). She has received three other Olivier Award nominations for her roles in Mephisto (1986), Hedda Gabler (1992), and Happy Days (2008). She made her Broadway debut playing the title role in Medea (2002) for which she earned a nomination for the Tony Award for Best Actress in a Play. She returned to Broadway in the Colm Tobin play The Testament of Mary (2013).

She is perhaps most known for her roles as Petunia Dursley in the Harry Potter film series (2001–2010). Other notable film roles include in My Left Foot (1989), Persuasion (1995), Jane Eyre (1996), The Tree of Life (2011), Colette (2018), Ammonite (2020), and Enola Holmes (2020).

She gained attention for her roles as Hedda Hopper in the HBO film RKO 281 (1999), and Marnie Stonebrook in the HBO series True Blood (2011).
She earned acclaim for her role as Carolyn Martens in the BBC series Killing Eve (2018–22) for which she received the 2019 BAFTA TV Award for Best Supporting Actress as well as two Primetime Emmy Award for Outstanding Supporting Actress in a Drama Series nominations. For her role as a Counselor in Phoebe Waller-Bridge series Fleabag (2019) she received a  Primetime Emmy Award for Outstanding Guest Actress in a Comedy Series nomination. She recently starred in the BBC One series Baptiste (2021), and the Disney+ series Andor (2022).

Early life
Shaw was born Fiona Mary Wilson on 10 July 1958 in Cobh, County Cork, the daughter of physicist Mary T. (Flynn) Wilson and ophthalmic surgeon Denis Joseph Wilson (1922–2011), who wed in 1952. They maintained a home in Montenotte. She attended secondary school at Scoil Mhuire in Cork, and received her degree in philosophy at University College Cork.

Shaw's father, Denis Wilson, studied medicine at University College Cork where he played rugby. He worked for a short time as a GP in London before training to be an ophthalmologist as the Manchester Royal Infirmary in 1960. On his return to Cork he was appointed to the Eye, Ear and Throat Hospital, where he worked until his retirement, which coincided with the transfer of the eye unit to Cork University Hospital. He taught at UCC and the RCSI. After retiring he wrote De Iron Trote, a history of the Eye, Ear and Throat Hospital and continued his interest in the arts by studying for a Diploma in Art History at UCC.

Career
Shaw trained at the Royal Academy of Dramatic Art (RADA) in London and was part of a "new wave" of actors to emerge from RADA. She received much acclaim as Julia in the National Theatre production of Richard Brinsley Sheridan's The Rivals (1983). Her theatrical roles include Celia in As You Like It (1984), Madame de Volanges in Les Liaisons Dangereuses (1985), Katherine in The Taming of the Shrew (1987), Lady Franjul in The New Inn (1987), Young Woman in Machinal (1993), for which she won the Laurence Olivier Award for Best Actress, Winnie in Happy Days (2007), and the title roles in Electra (1988), The Good Person of Sechuan (1989), Hedda Gabler (1991), The Prime of Miss Jean Brodie (1998) and Medea (2000). She performed T. S. Eliot's poem The Waste Land as a one-person show at the Liberty Theatre in New York to great acclaim in 1996, winning the Drama Desk Award for Outstanding One-Person Show for her performance. She played Miss Morrison in the 1984 The Adventures of Sherlock Holmes episode "The Adventure of the Crooked Man" and Catherine Greenshaw in Agatha Christie's Marple episode "Greenshaw's Folly" in 2013.

Shaw notably played the male lead in Richard II, directed by Deborah Warner in 1995. Shaw has collaborated with Warner on a number of occasions, on both stage and screen. Shaw has also worked in film and television, including My Left Foot (1989), Mountains of the Moon (1990), Three Men and a Little Lady (1990), Super Mario Bros. (1993), Undercover Blues (1993), Persuasion (1995), Jane Eyre (1996), The Butcher Boy (1997), The Avengers (1998), Gormenghast (2000), and five of the Harry Potter films in which she played Harry Potter's aunt. Shaw had a brief but key role in Brian DePalma's The Black Dahlia (2006).

In 2009, Shaw collaborated with Deborah Warner again, taking the lead role in Tony Kushner's translation of Bertolt Brecht's Mother Courage and Her Children. In a 2002 article for The Daily Telegraph, Rupert Christiansen described their professional relationship as "surely one of the most richly creative partnerships in theatrical history." Other collaborations between the two women include productions of Brecht's The Good Woman of Szechuan and Ibsen's Hedda Gabler, the latter was adapted for television.

Shaw appeared in The Waste Land at Wilton's Music Hall in January 2010 and in a National Theatre revival of London Assurance in March 2010. In November 2010, Shaw starred in Ibsen's John Gabriel Borkman at the Abbey Theatre, Dublin alongside Alan Rickman and Lindsay Duncan. The play was also staged in New York's Brooklyn Academy of Music in 2011. In 2012, Shaw appeared in the National Theatre revival of Scenes from an Execution by Howard Barker. The world's largest solo theatre festival, United Solo, recognised her performance in The Testament of Mary on Broadway with the 2013 United Solo Special Award.

Shaw appeared in season four of the American TV show True Blood. Shaw's character, Marnie Stonebrook, has been described as an underachieving palm reader who is spiritually possessed by an actual witch. In 2018, Shaw began portraying Carolyn Martens, the head of MI6's Russia-focused branch, in BBC America's Killing Eve. For her performance, she won the BAFTA Award for Best Actress in a Supporting Role in a Television Series. Later the same year, she played a senior MI6 officer in Mrs Wilson. She currently stars in the Star Wars television series Andor, a prequel to the movie Rogue One, as the titular character's adoptive mother, Maarva Andor.

Shaw is an award-winning audiobook narrator; in October 2022, Shaw was awarded an AudioFile Magazine Earphone Award for her performance of The Bullet That Missed, the third book in Richard Osman's The Thursday Murder Club series.

Personal life
Shaw is a lesbian, although she had dated men for many years before realising her sexual orientation, stating "It was a shock. I was full of self-hatred and thought I would come back into the fold shortly. But I just didn't."

A Catholic, from 2002 to 2005, Shaw was the partner of English actress Saffron Burrows. She met Sri Lankan economist Sonali Deraniyagala after reading Deraniyagala's memoir, and they married in 2018.

Filmography

Film

Television

Other projects 
 When Love Speaks (2002, EMI Classics): "It is thy will thy image should keep open"
 Simon Schama's John Donne: 2009

Awards and nominations

References

External links
 
 
 World Theatre – Working in the Theatre Seminar video at American Theatre Wing.org, January 2002
 Fiona Shaw interviewed by Sophie Elmhirst on New Statesman, September 2009
 Fiona Shaw (director) on Operabase

1958 births
Alumni of RADA
Alumni of University College Cork
Irish lesbian actresses
Critics' Circle Theatre Award winners
Drama Desk Award winners
Honorary Commanders of the Order of the British Empire
Irish film actresses
Irish stage actresses
Irish television actresses
Irish theatre directors
Irish voice actresses
Audiobook narrators
Irish Shakespearean actresses
Living people
Irish opera directors
Laurence Olivier Award winners
People from County Cork
People educated at Scoil Mhuire, Cork
Royal Shakespeare Company members
20th-century Irish actresses
21st-century Irish actresses
LGBT Roman Catholics
Best Supporting Actress BAFTA Award (television) winners
Theatre World Award winners